The sub-commentaries (Pali: ṭīkā) are primarily commentaries on the commentaries (Pali: aṭṭhakathā) on the Pali Canon of Theravada Buddhism, written in Sri Lanka. This literature continues the commentaries' development of the traditional interpretation of the scriptures.  (Note that some commentaries are apparently also named with the term ṭīkā.) These sub-commentaries were begun during the reign of Parākramabāhu I (1123–1186) under prominent Sri Lankan scholars such as Sāriputta Thera, Mahākassapa Thera of Dimbulagala Vihāra and Moggallāna Thera.

Burmese collection
The official Burmese collected edition contains the following texts:

 Paramatthamañjusā, ṭīkā by Dhammapāla on Buddhaghosa's Visuddhimagga; scholars have not yet settled which Dhammapāla this is
 Three ṭīkāyo on the Samantapāsādikā, commentary on the Vinaya Piṭaka:
 Ṭīkā by Vajirabuddhi
 Sāratthadīpanī by Sāriputta Thera (12th century)
 Vimativinodanī by Mahākassapa Thera (13th century)
 Two ṭīkāyo on the Kankhavitarani, commentary on the Pāṭimokkha
 Ṭīkāyo by Dhammapāla on Buddhaghosa's Sumangalavilasinī, Papancasudanī and Saratthapakasini, commentaries on the Dīgha, Majjhima and Saṃyutta Nikāya; it is generally considered by scholars that this is a different Dhammapāla from the one who wrote commentaries.
 Visuddha(jana)vilasini by Nanabhivamsa, head of the Burmese sangha, about 1800; a new partial tika on the Sumangalavilasini, covering only the first volume of the Digha Nikāya
 Saratthamanjusa by Sāriputta Thera on Buddhaghosa's Manorathapurani on the Aṅguttara Nikāya
 Nettitīkā on Dhammapāla's commentary on the Nettipakaraṇa
 Nettivibhavini by a 16th-century Burmese author whose name is given in different manuscripts as Saddhamma-, Samanta- or Sambandha-pala; this is not a new tika on the Netti commentary, but a new commentary on the Netti itself
 Mūlatīkā by Ānanda on the commentaries on the Abhidhamma Piṭaka
 Anutīkā on the Mūlatīkā

There are other tikas without this official recognition, some printed, some surviving in manuscript, some apparently lost. The name tika is also applied to commentaries on all non-canonical works, such as the Mahāvaṃsa. There are also some sub-commentaries in vernacular languages.
 
Extracts from some of these works have been translated, usually along with translations of commentaries.

References

Pali Buddhist texts
Theravada literature
Buddhist commentaries